John Tolan may refer to:

John H. Tolan (1877–1947), American politician
Johnnie Tolan (1917–1986), American racecar driver
John V. Tolan (born 1959), American historian

See also
John Toland (disambiguation)